Jack Singleton (born 14 May 1996) is an English professional rugby union player who plays at hooker for Premiership Rugby club Gloucester.

Club career
Singleton came through the Saracens Academy prior to joining Worcester Warriors in 2014. In October 2016 he made his professional debut for Worcester away in Russia against Enisei-STM in the EPCR Challenge Cup. In what proved to be a markedly good first professional season at Worcester, Singleton made twenty appearances. His Premiership debut came against Northampton Saints in November 2016. Singleton’s good form as a young player, saw him collect a 'Club's Young Player of the Season' award for the 2016–2017 campaign.

After five years at Worcester, Singleton returned to Saracens in 2019. On 11 March 2020, Singleton joined Gloucester on a season-long loan deal for the 2020-21 season after Saracens were relegated to the RFU Championship due to salary cap breaches. It was later confirmed he would remain at Gloucester permanently from the 2021–22 season.

International career
Singleton scored four tries in a game against Italy in the 2016 Six Nations Under 20s Championship. He was selected for the 2016 World Rugby Under 20 Championship and scored tries in pool matches against Italy and Scotland. He started in the final as England defeated Ireland to become junior world champions.

In May 2017 Singleton received his first call-up to the senior England squad by coach Eddie Jones and started in a non-cap game against the Barbarians. He was a member of the squad on their tour of Argentina but remained on the bench for both tests. He was also called up as injury cover during their 2018 tour of South Africa but did not participate in the series.

On 11 August 2019, Singleton won his first cap for England off the bench against Wales at Twickenham in a warm-up match and the next day his selection for the 2019 Rugby World Cup was confirmed. His only appearance at the tournament came as a replacement for Luke Cowan-Dickie during a pool stage fixture against the United States.

Singleton was called up to the England squad on 15 November 2021 as cover for the injured Jamie George for the game against South Africa during the 2021 Autumn Nations Series.

References

External links
England RFU profile
ESPN profile

1996 births
Living people
England international rugby union players
English rugby union players
Gloucester Rugby players
Saracens F.C. players
Worcester Warriors players
Rugby union hookers
Rugby union players from Tring